The Augusta AVA was established on June 20, 1980 as the first federally approved American Viticultural Area, eight months before the Napa Valley AVA in northern California. The petition was submitted by Clayton W. Byers and Lucian W. Dressel, representing the local wine industry, to the Director of the Bureau of Alcohol, Tobacco and Firearms on October 16, 1978. Located entirely within the state of Missouri, the boundaries of this wine region encompass  around the city of Augusta near the intersection of St. Charles County, Warren County and Franklin County.

History
The area around the present day city of Augusta was founded in 1836 by Leonard Harold, a follower of Daniel Boone, as a riverboat landing along the Missouri. The town was originally named Mount Pleasant with the riverboat landing known as Augusta Bend. In 1855, the town was incorporated as the city of Augusta. In 1859, Georg and Friedrich Muench founded one of the earliest wineries in the area, Mount Pleasant Winery. Flooding in the Missouri River valley caused the river to change course in 1872, drying up the area's riverboat landing and leaving a distinct soil type in the area between the town and the river. The area's early vineyards were planted in the 1880s and the area began receiving recognition for the distinctive flavors and profile of the wine being produced there. In the later parts of the 19th and early 20th century, the production volume from the area helped the Missouri wine industry compete with Ohio for market share east of the Rocky Mountains. The advent of Prohibition had a dramatic effect on the area causing the closure of local wineries and the uprooting of vineyards. A revival period occurred in the 1960s that led to the founding of many of the area's current wineries.

At the turn of the 21st century, wines from the Augusta AVA were exported to Germany. In 2003, Augusta Winery's 2001 Chardonel won "Best US wine" from the German wine magazine Selection at their yearly competition in Mainz.

Geography and soil

The soil in this area is a type of loam known as Hayne Silt-Loam which is heaviest in clay composition in the areas closest to the river but has more silt concentration in the higher elevations where most of the vineyards are now located.

Grapes

The Augusta AVA is planted with some Vitis vinifera including Cabernet Sauvignon, Pinot noir, Chardonnay, and Merlot as well the Vitis aestivalis grape Norton which is the official grape of the State of Missouri. French-American hybrid grapes like Chambourcin, Chardonel, Couderc noir, Rayon d'Or, Seyval blanc, St. Vincent and Vidal blanc are also popular plantings.

References

External links
Augusta Wine Country
Wineries in Augusta
  TTB AVA Map

American Viticultural Areas
Geography of Franklin County, Missouri
Missouri wine
Missouri Rhineland
Geography of St. Charles County, Missouri
Geography of Warren County, Missouri
1980 establishments in Missouri